Ambetilia is a monotypic snout moth genus described by Boris Balinsky in 1994. Its single species, Ambetilia crucifera, described by the same author, is found in South Africa.

References

Phycitinae
Monotypic moth genera
Moths of Africa